Goodenia ochracea is a species of flowering plant in the family Goodeniaceae and is endemic to the extreme west of Western Australia. It is a low-lying, stolon-forming herb with clusters of lance-shaped, toothed leaves at the base of the plant, and racemes of deep yellow flowers.

Description

Taxonomy and naming
Goodenia ochracea was first formally described in 1990 Roger Charles Carolin in the journal Telopea from a specimen collected by Charles Gardner near Shark Bay in 1932. The specific epithet (ochracea) means "ochre-yellow", referring to the colour of the petals.

Distribution and habitat
This goodenia grows in sandy soil in the Carnarvon-Shark Bay area in the extreme west of Western Australia.

Conservation status
Goodenia ochracea is classified as "not threatened" by the Government of Western Australia Department of Parks and Wildlife.

References

ochracea
Eudicots of Western Australia
Plants described in 1990
Taxa named by Roger Charles Carolin
Endemic flora of Australia